Hangool and haital are unique medieval products of Assam used as paints. Many of the manuscripts written in the medieval period contain paintings using hangool and haital.

Culture of Assam